Andile Jho is a South African rugby union player who last played for the  in the Currie Cup and in the Rugby Challenge. His regular position is centre.

Rugby career

His performances lead to him being included in the South Africa Under–16 Elite squad in 2008, the Under–18 High Performance squads in 2009 and 2010 and the S.A. Schools squad in 2009.

He then joined the  academy, playing for them at Under–19 level in 2011 and Under–21 level in 2012.

Personal life

Andile scored his first senior try in this match in a 10–50 defeat.

References

South African rugby union players
Eastern Province Elephants players
Sportspeople from Qonce
Living people
1992 births
Rugby union centres
Rugby union players from the Eastern Cape